Balwant Singh is an Indian politician who served as a Member of the Haryana Legislative Assembly from the Sadhaura Assembly constituency representing the Bharatiya Janata Party from 2014 to 2019.

References

Living people
Year of birth missing (living people)
Place of birth missing (living people)
Bharatiya Janata Party politicians from Haryana
Haryana MLAs 2000–2005
Haryana MLAs 2005–2009
Haryana MLAs 2014–2019